The Thumbs were an American punk rock band from Baltimore, Maryland, United States.  They were active from 1995 until approximately 2002.  They were known for having an intense touring ethic, having completed nine U.S. tours, and two Japanese tours between 1997 and 2001.  The band was formed by Mike Hall, Bobby Borte, and Mark Minnig, however Hall and Borte remained the only constant members amidst constant drummer changes.

History
The Thumbs were formed when Mike Hall left his former band The Pee Tanks and Borte and Minnig left their former band Rubber Sole.  While active, The Thumbs released records on their own Sneezeguard Records, as well as Soda Jerk Records, Adeline Records, and Snuffy Smile.

Members
 Mike Hall - Vocals, Guitar (1995–1998), Vocals, Bass (1998–2003)
 Bobby Borte - Vocals, Guitar (1995–2003)
 Mark Minnig - Vocals, Bass (1995–1998)
 Tom Fortwengler - Drums US Tour Sept 1998
 Phil Spence - Drums (1996–1999), Sprague Dawley Rats recording (1996), Sweet Merciful Crap (1997), Make America Strong (1998)
 Lee Ashlin - Drums scattered appearances in late 1990s, 2001-2003 Japan Tour No. 2 Sept 2001
 Randy Rampage - Drums (1995–1996), self-titled 12" 1995, All Lesser Devils recording 1999, 2nd Snuffy Smile 7" recording 2001
 Roman Kuebler- Drums (2000–2001) Last Match recording
 Bug - Drums US/Japan Tour Sept 1999
 Friendly Pat - Drums US Tour March 1999
 Jason Gambrel - US Tour Jan-Mar 1997, Eldon recording 1999
 Pat from Crispus Attucks - Eldon recording 1999

Discography

EPs
 Sprague Dawley Rats - 7" EP Sneezeguard Records
 Sweet Merciful Crap - 7" EP Soda Jerk Records
 All Lesser Devils - 7"/CD EP Adeline Records
 The Thumbs/The Urchin - Split 7" on Snuffy Smile
 The Thumbs/Jack Palance Band - Split 7" on ADD records
 The Thumbs/One Leaf  - Split 7" on Snuffy Smile

LPs
 The Thumbs - 12" LP Sneezeguard Records
 Make America Strong - CD Soda Jerk Records
 Last Match - CD/LP Adeline Records

Compilations
 "Dropping Food On Their Heads Is Not Enough - GC Records - They Improve Ideas
 52 Lessons on Life Reinforcement Records - They Improve Ideas
 Every Dog Will Have Its Day, Adeline Records Comp.2 - Hour One
 Fast Music Comp CD (Fast Music 2000) Song - "Drug Screamer"
 Might As Well Can't Dance CD (Adeline 2000) Song - "Ribbon Men"
 Dear Fred: Standby For The Next Objective CD (Sneezeguard, 1998.) Song - "I Don't"
 A.D.D. Zine Comp CD (A.D.D. Records, 1999) Song - "John Staab Pants"
 Letters From Punksville CD (Re-inforcement Records, 1998) Song - "Looking For The Cure"
 Punx Just Want To Have Fun cassette comp (8TH DImension Records, 1998) Song - "Sasquatch"
 Breathmint Comp CD (Breathmint Records, 1998) Song - "Happens All The Time" (recorded at WFMU OCT 97)
 Punker Than Your Mother CD (Soda Jerk, 1998) Song - "Pilot Fish"
 North American Takeover CD (Cloister Records, 1998) Songs - "Chrissy Snow", "Fall at Your Feet"
 It Takes a Dummy to Know a Dummy CD (Dumb Ass Records, 1997) Song - "Sprague Dawley Rats"
 If It's Not Punk, It's Junk CD (GFY Records, 1997) Song - "Shuck"
 Exploitational Sampler CD (Creep Records, 1996) Song - "Chrissy Snow"

Where are they now?
 Mike and Bobby play for The Sick Sick Birds
 Lee Ashlin plays for The Fuses, The Swims, and Meanspirits
 Roman plays for The Oranges Band
 Mark Minnig plays bass in Kid Casanova and runs a coffee shop in New York City

References

External links
 The Thumbs Homepage
 [ Allmusic]
 Sneezeguard Records Homepage
 History on Epitonic.com
 City Paper Writeup
 Sneezeguard Records

Punk rock groups from Maryland
Adeline Records artists